Clausena lansium, also known as wampee or wampi, from Cantonese wong4 pei4-2 gwo2 (黄皮果, yellow-skinned fruit) (Clausena wampi), is a species of strongly scented evergreen trees 3–8 m tall, in the family Rutaceae, native to southeast Asia.

Its leaves are smooth and dark green. White flowers in late March are white, with four or five petals, about 3–4 mm in diameter. The fruit is oval, about 3 cm long and 2 cm in diameter, and contains two to five seeds that occupy ~40-50% of the fruit volume. The tree reaches a maximum height of 20 meters. It grows well in tropical or subtropical conditions, and is susceptible to cold. Wampee trees grow well in a wide range of soil, but will grow best in rich loam.

The wampee is cultivated for its fruit, which is a grape-sized, fragrant citrus. Its skin and seeds are often eaten alongside the pulp, much like kumquat. The tree is popular in China, Vietnam, the Philippines, Malaysia, and Indonesia. Less frequently, it is grown in India, Sri Lanka, and Queensland; occasionally, it is cultivated even in Florida and Hawaii.

It is grown extensively in the New Territories of Hong Kong, and is a popular fruit among the indigenous Hakka villagers.

Gallery

References

lansium
Edible fruits